The men's 110 metres hurdles sprint competition of the athletics events at the 1979 Pan American Games took place on 9 and 11 July at the Estadio Sixto Escobar. The defending Pan American Games champion was Alejandro Casañas of Cuba.

Records
Prior to this competition, the existing world and Pan American Games records were as follows:

Results

Heats

Wind:Heat 1: +0.1 m/s, Heat 2: +0.3 m/s

Final

Wind: +2.0 m/s

References

Athletics at the 1979 Pan American Games
1979